Coimbatore–Tuticorin Link Express (Train Nos 22669/22670) is a daily express train run by Indian Railways between Coimbatore city Junction and Thoothukudi in Tamil Nadu. The train made its inaugural run on 11 June 2011. Now, i.e. from 28.06.2017, it was upgraded as superfast express train.

Service and schedule

Route and stations
This train passes through 14 intermediate stations including Tiruppur, Erode, Karur, Dindigul, Madurai, Virudhunagar, Kovilpatti, and Vanchi Maniyachchi.

Coach and rake
The Coimbatore–Tuticorin express has no rake sharing arrangement. The train is pulled by Erode WAP-4 or Golden Rock WDP-4.

References

External links

Rail transport in Tamil Nadu
Express trains in India
Transport in Coimbatore
Railway services introduced in 2011
Transport in Thoothukudi